Donostialdea is one of the eight regions of Gipuzkoa, in the Basque Autonomous Community, corresponding to the basin of the lower Urumea River, along with a strip of basin corresponding to the Oria River, the region borrowing its name from Donostia-San Sebastián, the capital city of Gipuzkoa in Spain. The region comprises eleven municipalities extending in an area of 305.72 km2 (see below, data released in 2006). It borders in the east with the region or subcomarca of Oarsoaldea, on the south with Leitzaldea or Norte de Aralar in Spanish (Navarre), on the west with Urola Kosta and on the north with the Bay of Biscay.

The area is served by the San Sebastián Metro, part of the Euskotren Trena network operated by Euskotren.

Comarcas of Gipuzkoa